Dakin may refer to:

People
Dakin (surname) 
Dakin of Sennar (1568–1585/6), Sudanese ruler of the Kingdom of Sennar

Places
Dakin, a locality in Athabasca County, Alberta, Canada
Dakin Island, Western Australia; see List of islands in the Houtman Abrolhos

Other
Dakin (company), American manufacturer of stuffed animal toys
Dakin Building, office building in Brisbane, California, United States
 Dakin's Solution
Dakin reaction, chemical reaction of phenolic aldehydes (or ketones) with hydrogen peroxide
Dakin-West reaction, chemical reaction that transforms an amino-acid into an amino-ketone using an acid anhydride and a base

See also
Dakins (disambiguation)